Dahimi-ye Yek may refer to:
 Dahimi-ye Yek, Dasht-e Azadegan
 Dahimi-ye Yek, Shush